This is a list of games made by the American video game developer and publisher MicroProse. The games in this list were developed internally by MicroProse. Some games made by other developers were published under MicroProse's Microplay or MicroStyle label. In 1989 MicroProse acquired the British publisher Telecomsoft and subsequently published games under their Firebird and Rainbird labels. MicroProse was used as a brand name from 1998 to 2002 by Hasbro Interactive and Infogrames.

List

References
Notes

Footnotes

MicroProse